The 1981 Los Angeles Dodgers season got off to a strong start when rookie pitcher Fernando Valenzuela pitched a shutout on opening day, starting the craze that came to be known as "Fernandomania."  Fernando went on to win both the Rookie of the Year and Cy Young Awards.

The season was divided into two halves because of a two-month long mid-season players' strike. The Dodgers won the Western Division of the National League in the first half and advanced to the playoffs. They beat the Houston Astros in a divisional playoff and the Montreal Expos in the National League Championship Series before beating the New York Yankees to win the World Series.

Offseason 
December 4, 1980:  Don Sutton signed with the Houston Astros as a free agent.
March 30, 1981: Acquired Ken Landreaux from the Minnesota Twins for Mickey Hatcher and Matt Reeves

Regular season

Season standings

Record vs. opponents

Opening Day lineup

Roster

Game log

Regular season Game log

First half

|-style=background:#cfc
| 1 || April 9 || || Astros || W 2–0 || Valenzuela (1–0) || Niekro (0–1) || – || 50,511 || 1–0 ||
|-style=background:#cfc
| 2 || April 11 || || Astros || W 7–4 || Hooton (1–0) || Sutton (0–1) || – || 51,691 || 2–0 ||
|-style=background:#cfc
| 3 || April 12 || || Astros || W 3–2 || Sutcliffe (1–0) || Ruhle (0–1) || Howe (1) || 50,734 || 3–0 ||
|-style=background:#cfc
| 4 || April 13 || || @ Giants || W 4–3 || Stewart (1–0) || Ripley (0–1) || Castillo (1) || 20,698 || 4–0 ||
|-style=background:#cfc
| 5 || April 14 || || @ Giants || W 7–1 || Valenzuela (2–0) || Blue (0–1) || – || 23,790 || 5–0 ||
|-style=background:#cfc
| 6 || April 15 || || @ Giants || W 4–2 || Hooton (2–0) || Whitson (0–1) || Castillo (2) || 20,775 || 6–0 ||
|-style=background:#fbb
| 7 || April 17 || || @ Padres || L 2–3 (10) || Lollar (1–0) || Howe (0–1) || – || 26,157 || 6–1 ||
|-style=background:#cfc
| 8 || April 18 || || @ Padres || W 2–0 || Valenzuela (3–0) || Wise (0–2) || – || 19,776 || 7–1 ||
|-style=background:#cfc
| 9 || April 19 || || @ Padres || W 6–1 || Welch (1–0) || Curtis (0–2) || Castillo (3) || 11,498 || 8–1 ||
|-style=background:#cfc
| 10 || April 20 || || @ Astros || W 5–2 || Hooton (3–0) || Andújar (0–1) || Goltz (1) || 21,730 || 9–1 ||
|-style=background:#fbb
| 11 || April 21 || || @ Astros || L 0–1 || Knepper (1–0) || Reuss (0–1) || – || 21,904 || 9–2 ||
|-style=background:#cfc
| 12 || April 22 || || @ Astros || W 1–0 || Valenzuela (4–0) || Sutton (0–3) || – || 22,830 || 10–2 ||
|-style=background:#cfc
| 13 || April 23 || || Padres || W 3–1 || Sutcliffe (2–0) || Wise (0–3) || Howe (2) || 35,027 || 11–2 ||
|-style=background:#fbb
| 14 || April 24 || || Padres || L 5–6 || Lucas (2–1) || Castillo (0–1) || Lollar (1) || 49,256 || 11–3 ||
|-style=background:#cfc
| 15 || April 25 || || Padres || W 2–1 (11) || Howe (1–1) || Littlefield (0–1) || – || 44,985 || 12–3 ||
|-style=background:#cfc
| 16 || April 26 || || Padres || W 3–2 || Reuss (1–1) || Lucas (2–2) || – || 50,533 || 13–3 ||
|-style=background:#cfc
| 17 || April 27 || || Giants || W 5–0 || Valenzuela (5–0) || Griffin (1–2) || – || 49,478 || 14–3 ||
|-style=background:#fbb
| 18 || April 28 || || Giants || L 1–6 || Ripley (1–2) || Sutcliffe (2–1) || – || 39,899 || 14–4 ||
|-style=background:#fbb
| 19 || April 29 || || Giants || L 2–3 || Blue (2–2) || Welch (1–1) || Minton (3) || 39,110 || 14–5 ||

|-style=background:#fbb
| 20 || May 1 || || @ Expos || L 8–9 (13) || Lee (1–0) || Castillo (0–2) || – || 28,179 || 14–6 ||
|-style=background:#cfc
| 21 || May 2 || || @ Expos || W 4–0 || Reuss (2–1) || Sanderson (3–1) || – || 22,820 || 15–6 ||
|-style=background:#cfc
| 22 || May 3 || || @ Expos || W 6–1 (10) || Valenzuela (6–0) || Gullickson (1–2) || – || 46,405 || 16–6 ||
|-style=background:#fbb
| 23 || May 4 || || @ Expos || L 3–4 || Rogers (3–1) || Sutcliffe (2–2) || Sosa (2) || 21,527 || 16–7 ||
|-style=background:#fbb
| 24 || May 5 || || @ Phillies || L 7–8 || Lyle (2–1) || Castillo (0–3) || – || 27,241 || 16–8 ||
|-style=background:#cfc
| 25 || May 6 || || @ Phillies || W 2–1 || Hooton (4–0) || Espinosa (1–2) || – || 25,850 || 17–8 ||
|-style=background:#cfc
| 26 || May 7 || || @ Phillies || W 2–1 || Reuss (3–1) || Bystrom (2–1) || – || 29,259 || 18–8 ||
|-style=background:#cfc
| 27 || May 8 || || @ Mets || W 1–0 || Valenzuela (7–0) || Scott (1–3) || – || 39,848 || 19–8 ||
|-style=background:#fbb
| 28 || May 9 || || @ Mets || L 4–7 || Allen (2–0) || Castillo (1–3) || Reardon (1) || 16,776 || 19–9 ||
|-style=background:#cfc
| 29 || May 10 || || @ Mets || W 5–3 || Welch (2–1) || Jones (0–5) || Howe (3) || 12,102 || 20–9 ||
|-style=background:#cfc
| 30 || May 12 || || Expos || W 5–0 || Hooton (5–0) || Burris (2–3) || Howe (4) || 34,367 || 21–9 ||
|-style=background:#cfc
| 31 || May 13 || || Expos || W 8–6 || Howe (2–1) || Fryman (2–1) || – || 42,712 || 22–9 ||
|-style=background:#cfc
| 32 || May 14 || || Expos || W 3–2 || Valenzuela (8–0) || Ratzer (1–1) || – || 53,906 || 23–9 ||
|-style=background:#cfc
| 33 || May 15 || || Mets || W 6–5 || Howe (3–1) || Allen (2–1) || – || 49,860 || 24–9 ||
|-style=background:#cfc
| 34 || May 16 || || Mets || W 9–0 || Hooton (6–0) || Roberts (0–3) || – || 51,000 || 25–9 ||
|-style=background:#cfc
| 35 || May 17 || || Mets || W 6–1 || Reuss (4–1) || Zachry (3–5) || – || 50,746 || 26–9 ||
|-style=background:#fbb
| 36 || May 18 || || Phillies || L 0–4 || Bystrom (3–2) || Valenzuela (8–1) || – || 52,439 || 26–10 ||
|-style=background:#fbb
| 37 || May 19 || || Phillies || L 2–3 || Ruthven (6–1) || Welch (2–2) || – || 43,812 || 26–11 ||
|-style=background:#cfc
| 38 || May 20 || || Phillies || W 3–2 (10) || Howe (4–1) || McGraw (1–4) || – || 50,917 || 27–11 ||
|-style=background:#cfc
| 39 || May 22 || || @ Reds || W 4–2 (12) || Stewart (2–0) || Bair (1–1) || – || 27,943 || 28–11 ||
|-style=background:#cfc
| 40 || May 23 || || @ Reds || W 9–6 (10) || Stewart (3–0) || Moskau (1–1) || Castillo (4) || 40,928 || 29–11 ||
|-style=background:#fbb
| 41 || May 24 || || @ Reds || L 2–3 || Moskau (2–1) || Welch (2–3) || Price (1) || – || 29–12 ||
|-style=background:#cfc
| 42 || May 24 || || @ Reds || W 10–3 || Castillo (1–4) || Berenyi (4–2) || – || 36,113 || 30–12 ||
|-style=background:#cfc
| 43 || May 25 || || @ Braves || W 7–1 || Hooton (7–0) || Walk (1–4) || Castillo (5) || 11,911 || 31–12 ||
|-style=background:#fbb
| 44 || May 27 || || @ Braves || L 2–3 || Camp (5–1) || Howe (4–2) || – || 17,581 || 31–13 ||
|-style=background:#fbb
| 45 || May 28 || || @ Braves || L 4–9 || Perry (4–3) || Valenzuela (8–2) || – || 26,597 || 31–14 ||
|-style=background:#cfc
| 46 || May 29 || || Reds || W 5–2 || Welch (3–3) || LaCoss (2–5) || Howe (5) || 45,749 || 32–14 ||
|-style=background:#fbb
| 47 || May 30 || || Reds || L 1–9 || Pastore (2–2) || Hooton (7–1) || – || 43,582 || 32–15 ||
|-style=background:#cfc
| 48 || May 31 || || Reds || W 16–4 || Goltz (1–0) || Soto (4–6) || – || 46,411 || 33–15 ||

|-style=background:#cfc
| 49 || June 1 || || Braves || W 5–2 || Valenzuela (9–2) || Boggs (1–8) || – || 49,136 || 34–15 ||
|-style=background:#fbb
| 50 || June 2 || || Braves || L 1–3 (10) || Perry (5–3) || Stewart (3–1) || Camp (6) || 37,448 || 34–16 ||
|-style=background:#fbb
| 51 || June 3 || || Braves || L 2–4 || Niekro (4–3) || Hooton (7–2) || Camp (7) || 42,649 || 34–17 ||
|-style=background:#fbb
| 52 || June 5 || || @ Cubs || L 3–4 || Reuschel (3–7) || Reuss (4–2) || Tidrow (4) || 7,815 || 34–18 ||
|-style=background:#fbb
| 53 || June 6 || || @ Cubs || L 5–11 || McGlothen (1–3) || Valenzuela (9–3) || || 30,556 || 34–19 ||
|-style=background:#cfc
| 54 || June 7 || || @ Cubs || W 7–0 || Welch (4–3) || Martz (2–5) || – || 20,024 || 35–19 || 
|-style=background:#fbb
| 55 || June 9 || || @ Cardinals || L 1–6 || Forsch (6–2) || Hooton (7–3) || Sutter (10) || 19,654 || 35–20 ||
|-style=background:#cfc
| 56 || June 10 || || @ Cardinals || W 4–1 || Reuss (5–2) || Sorensen (5–5) || – || 17,779 || 36–20 ||
|-style=background:#fbb
| 57 || June 11 || || @ Cardinals || L 1–2 || Martínez (2–4) || Valenzuela (9–4) || Sutter (11) || 39,250 || 36–21 ||

|- style="text-align:center;"
| Legend:       = Win       = Loss       = PostponementBold = Dodgers team member

Second half

|- style="background:#bbcaff;"
| – || August 9 || ||colspan=8 |1981 Major League Baseball All-Star Game at Cleveland Stadium in Cleveland
|-style=background:#cfc
| 58 || August 10 || || Reds || W 4–0 || Reuss (6–2) || Pastore (3–3) || Howe (6) || 35,120 || 37–21 ||
|-style=background:#fbb
| 59 || August 11 || || Reds || L 6–7 || Brown (1–0) || Forster (0–1) || Hume (6) || 45,817 || 37–22 || 
|-style=background:#cfc
| 60 || August 12 || || Reds || W 8–5 || Stewart (4–1) || Seaver (7–2) || Howe (7) || 36,494 || 38–22 ||
|-style=background:#fbb
| 61 || August 13 || || Braves || L 1–9 || Boggs (2–10) || Hooton (7–4) || Garber (1) || 27,418 || 38–23 ||
|-style=background:#cfc
| 62 || August 14 || || Braves || W 5–0 || Goltz (2–0) || Montefusco (1–3) || Peña (1) || 35,592 || 39–23 ||
|-style=background:#fbb
| 63 || August 15 || || Braves || L 4–6 || Bedrosian (1–0) || Reuss (6–3) || Hrabosky (1) || 40,510 || 39–24 ||
|-style=background:#cfc
| 64 || August 16 || || Braves || W 6–5 || Niedenfuer (1–0) || Bedrosian (1–1) || Stewart (1) || 50,340 || 40–24 ||
|-style=background:#fbb
| 65 || August 17 || || @ Cubs || L 1–3 || Bird (2–0) || Welch (4–4) || – || 10,153 || 40–25 ||
|-style=background:#cfc
| 66 || August 18 || || @ Cubs || W 5–0 || Hooton (8–4) || Griffin (0–1) || – || 15,973 || 41–25 ||
|-style=background:#fbb
| 67 || August 19 || || @ Cubs || L 3–4 || Krukow (4–6) || Goltz (2–1) || Martz (2) || 26,860 || 41–26 ||
|-style=background:#cfc
| 68 || August 21 || || @ Cardinals || W 4–0 || Reuss (7–3) || Andújar (3–4) || – || 33,375 || 42–26 ||
|-style=background:#cfc
| 69 || August 22 || || @ Cardinals || W 3–2 || Valenzuela (10–4) || Forsch (7–3) || Stewart (2) || 38,751 || 43–26 ||
|-style=background:#fbb
| 70 || August 23 || || @ Cardinals || L 7–11 || Shirley (5–3) || Welch (4–5) || Sutter (15) || 18,189 || 43–27 ||
|-style=background:#cfc
| 71 || August 24 || || @ Pirates || W 3–0 || Hooton (9–4) || Jones (1–1) || – || 12,308 || 44–27 ||
|-style=background:#cfc
| 72 || August 25 || || @ Pirates || W 9–7 (11) || Peña (1–0) || Tekulve (4–5) || Niedenfuer (1) || 16,770 || 45–27 ||
|-style=background:#cfc
| 73 || August 26 || || @ Pirates || W 16–6 || Reuss (8–3) || Rhoden (7–2) || – || 11,144 || 46–27 ||
|-style=background:#cfc
| 74 || August 27 || || Cubs || W 6–0 || Valenzuela (11–4) || Martz (4–6) || – || 48,191 || 47–27 ||
|-style=background:#cfc
| 75 || August 28 || || Cubs || W 6–1 || Welch (5–5) || Krukow (4–7) || Stewart (3) || 42,160 || 48–27 ||
|-style=background:#fbb
| 76 || August 29 || || Cubs || L 1–3 || Griffin (1–1) || Hooton (9–5) || Smith (1) || 47,424 || 48–28 ||
|-style=background:#fbb
| 77 || August 30 || || Cubs || L 1–2 || Bird (3–1) || Goltz (2–2) || Tidrow (7) || 34,284 || 48–29 ||
|-style=background:#fbb
| 78 || August 31 || || Pirates || L 4–5 (10) || Jones (2–1) || Stewart (4–2) || D. Robinson (1) || 35,862 || 48–30 ||

|-style=background:#cfc
| 79 || September 1 || || Pirates || W 3–2 (14) || Niedenfuer (2–0) || Jones (2–2) || – || 50,134 || 49–30 ||
|-style=background:#cfc
| 80 || September 2 || || Pirates || W 6–2 || Welch (6–5) || Long (0–1) || Peña (2) || 32,027 || 50–30 || 
|-style=background:#fbb
| 81 || September 3 || || Cardinals || L 3–5 || Littell (1–1) || Howe (4–3) || Sutter (19) || 30,122 || 50–31 ||
|-style=background:#fbb
| 82 || September 4 || || Cardinals || L 2–7 || Martin (5–2) || Goltz (2–3) || – || 48,114 || 50–32 ||
|-style=background:#cfc
| 83 || September 5 || || Cardinals || W 4–3 (11) || Niedenfuer (3–0) || Kaat (6–3) || – || 36,058 || 51–32 ||
|-style=background:#cfc
| 84 || September 6 || || Cardinals || W 5–0 || Valenzuela (12–4) || Forsch (7–5) || – || 46,780 || 52–32 ||
|-style=background:#cfc
| 85 || September 7 || || Giants || W 5–1 || Welch (7–5) || Whitson (5–7) || Niedenfuer (2) || 49,561 || 53–32 ||
|-style=background:#cfc
| 86 || September 8 || || Giants || W 4–0 || Hooton (10–5) || Alexander (8–6) || Stewart (4) || 31,702 || 54–32 ||
|-style=background:#fbb
| 87 || September 9 || || Giants || L 3–6 (11) || Holland (6–4) || Niedenfuer (3–1) || – || 31,482 || 54–33 ||
|-style=background:#fbb
| 88 || September 11 || || @ Reds || L 2–3 (10) || Price (5–1) || Peña (1–1) || – || 25,237 || 54–34 ||
|-style=background:#fbb
| 89 || September 12 || || @ Reds || L 5–6 (11) || LaCoss (4–7) || Power (0–1) || – || 34,090 || 54–35 ||
|-style=background:#cfc
| 90 || September 13 || || @ Reds || W 4–2 || Castillo (2–4) || Pastore (3–7) || Stewart (5) || 27,858 || 55–35 ||
|-style=background:#cfc
| 91 || September 14 || || @ Padres || W 10–5 || Power (1–1) || Show (0–2) || – || 7,243 || 56–35 ||
|-style=background:#fbb
| 92 || September 15 || || @ Padres || L 2–8 || Eichelberger (8–6) || Goltz (2–4) || – || 9,927 || 56–36 ||
|-style=background:#cfc
| 93 || September 16 || || Braves || W 3–2 || Reuss (9–3) || Perry (7–7) || Howe (8) || 19,905 || 57–36 ||
|-style=background:#cfc
| 94 || September 17 || || Braves || W 2–0 || Valenzuela (13–4) || Mahler (5–6) || – || 46,168 || 58–36 ||  
|-style=background:#fbb
| 95 || September 18 || || Reds || L 4–5 || Price (6–1) || Stewart (4–3) || Hume (10) || 44,258 || 58–37 || 
|-style=background:#fbb
| 96 || September 19 || || Reds || L 3–7 || Edelen (2–0) || Hooton (10–6) || – || 48,352 || 58–38 || 
|-style=background:#fbb
| 97 || September 20 || || Reds || L 1–5 || Soto (9–9) || Power (1–2) || – || 39,560 || 58–39 || 
|-style=background:#fbb
| 98 || September 22 || || @ Giants || L 2–5 || Whitson (6–8) || Valenzuela (13–5) || Minton (17) || 28,046 || 58–40 || 
|-style=background:#fbb
| 99 || September 23 || || @ Giants || L 4–8 || Lavelle (1–6) || Goltz (2–5) || Breining (1) || 13,058 || 58–41 ||
|-style=background:#cfc
| 100 || September 24 || || @ Giants || W 7–3 || Welch (8–5) || Griffin (8–8) || – || 12,726 || 59–41 ||
|-style=background:#cfc
| 101 || September 25 || || @ Astros || W 3–0 || Hooton (11–6) || Ruhle (4–5) || – || 35,481 || 60–41 ||
|-style=background:#fbb
| 102 || September 26 || || @ Astros || L 0–5 || Ryan (10–5) || Power (1–3) || – || 32,115 || 60–42 ||
|-style=background:#fbb
| 103 || September 27 || || @ Astros || L 1–4 || Sutton (11–8) || Valenzuela (13–6) || – || 41,686 || 60–43 ||
|-style=background:#fbb
| 104 || September 28 || || @ Braves || L 1–2 || Mahler (7–6) || Reuss (9–4) || Camp (16) || 2,348 || 60–44 ||
|-style=background:#cfc
| 105 || September 29 || || @ Braves || W 5–3 || Howe (5–3) || Garber (4–6) || Stewart (6) || 2,150 || 61–44 ||
|-style=background:#fbb
| 106 || September 30 || || Padres || L 0–2 || Boone (1–0) || Goltz (2–6) || Lucas (13) || 19,467 || 61–45 || 

|-style=background:#fbb
| 107 || October 1 || || Padres || L 0–1 || Kuhaulua (1–0) || Valenzuela (13–7) || Show (3) || 38,267 || 61–46 || 
|-style=background:#cfc
| 108 || October 2 || || Astros || W 6–1 || Reuss (10–4) || Sutton (11–9) || – || 46,108 || 62–46 ||
|-style=background:#cfc
| 109 || October 3 || || Astros || W 7–2 || Welch (9–5) || Niekro (9–9) || – || 42,272 || 63–46 ||
|-style=background:#fbb
| 110 || October 4 || || Astros || L 3–5 || Smith (5–3) || Goltz (2–7) || – || 47,072 || 63–47 ||
|-

|-
| Legend:       = Win       = Loss       = PostponementBold = Dodgers team member

Postseason Game log

|-style=background:#fbb
| 1 || October 6 || || @ Astros || L 1–3 || Ryan (1–0) || Stewart (0–1) || – || 44,836 || 0–1 ||
|-style=background:#fbb
| 2 || October 7 || || @ Astros || L 0–1 (11) || Sambito (1–0) || Stewart (0–2) || – || 42,398 || 0–2 ||
|-style=background:#cfc
| 3 || October 9 || || Astros || W 6–1 || Hooton (1–0) || Knepper (0–1) || – || 46,820 || 1–2 ||
|-style=background:#cfc
| 4 || October 10 || || Astros || W 2–1 || Valenzuela (1–0) || Ruhle (0–1 || – || 55,983 || 2–2 ||
|-style=background:#cfc
| 5 || October 11 || || Astros || W 4–0 || Reuss (1–0) || Ryan (1–1) || – || 55,979 || 3–2 ||
|-

|-style=background:#cfc
| 1 || October 13 || || Expos || W 5–1 || Hooton (1–0) || Gullickson (0–1) || – || 51,273 || 1–0 ||
|-style=background:#fbb
| 2 || October 14 || || Expos || L 0–3 || Burris (1–0) || Valenzuela (0–1) || – || 53,463 || 1–1 ||
|-style=background:#fbb
| 3 || October 16 || || @ Expos || L 1–4 || Rogers (1–0) ||  Reuss (0–1) || – || 54,372 || 1–2 ||
|-style=background:#cfc
| 4 || October 17 || || @ Expos || W 7–1 || Hooton (2–0) || Gullickson (0–2) || – || 54,499 || 2–2 ||
|-style=background:#bbb
||–|| October 18 || || @ Expos || colspan="7" | Postponed (Rain) (Makeup date: October 19) 
|-style=background:#cfc
| 5 || October 19 || || @ Expos || W 2–1 || Valenzuela (1–1) || Rogers (1–1) || Welch (1) || 36,491 || 3–2 ||
|-

|-style=background:#fbb
| 1 || October 20 || || @ Yankees || L 3–5 || Guidry (1–0) || Reuss (0–1) || Gossage (1) || 56,470 || 0–1 ||
|-style=background:#fbb
| 2 || October 21 || || @ Yankees || L 0–3 || John (1–0) || Hooton (0–1) || Gossage (2) || 56,505 || 0–2 ||
|-style=background:#cfc
| 3 || October 23 || || Yankees || W 5–4 || Valenzuela (1–0) || Frazier (0–1) || – || 56,236 || 1–2 ||
|-style=background:#cfc
| 4 || October 24 || || Yankees || W 8–7 || Howe (1–0) || Frazier (0–2) || – || 56,242 || 2–2 ||
|-style=background:#cfc
| 5 || October 25 || || Yankees || W 2–1 || Reuss (1–1) || Ron Guidry (1–1) || – || 56,115 || 3–2 ||
|-style=background:#bbb
||–|| October 27 || || @ Yankees || colspan="7" | Postponed (Rain) (Makeup date: October 28) 
|-style=background:#cfc
| 6 || October 28 || || @ Yankees || W 9–2 || Hooton (1–1) || Frazier (0–3) || Howe (1) || 56,513 || 4–2 ||
|-

|-
| Legend:       = Win       = Loss       = PostponementBold = Dodgers team member

Starting pitchers stats 
Note: G = Games pitched; GS = Games started; IP = Innings pitched; ERA = Earned run average; W/L = Wins/Losses; BB = Walks allowed; SO = Strikeouts; CG = Complete games

Relief pitchers stats 
Note: G = Games pitched; GS = Games started; IP = Innings pitched; ERA = Earned run average; W/L = Wins/Losses; BB = Walks allowed; SO = Strikeouts; SV = Saves

Batting stats 
Note: Pos = Position; G = Games played; AB = At bats; Avg. = Batting average; R = Runs scored; H = Hits; HR = Home runs; RBI = Runs batted in; SB = Stolen bases

Postseason

1981 National League Division Series 

In the divisional series, the Dodgers fell behind the Houston Astros two games to zero but came back to win the next three games to take the series and advance to the LCS.

Game 1 
October 6, The Astrodome, Houston, Texas

Game 2 
October 7, The Astrodome, Houston, Texas

Game 3 
October 9, Dodger Stadium, Los Angeles

Game 4 
October 10, Dodger Stadium, Los Angeles

Game 5 
October 11, Dodger Stadium, Los Angeles

1981 National League Championship Series 

The Dodgers faced the Montreal Expos in the 1981 NLCS and beat them three games to two, thanks to a ninth-inning home run by Rick Monday in Game 5.

Game 1 
October 13, Dodger Stadium, Los Angeles

Game 2 
October 14, Dodger Stadium, Los Angeles

Game 3 
October 16, Olympic Stadium, Montreal, Quebec

Game 4 
October 17, Olympic Stadium, Montreal, Quebec

Game 5 
October 19, Olympic Stadium, Montreal, Quebec

1981 World Series 

The Dodgers met the New York Yankees in the World Series once again, this time beating them in six games to claim their first championship since 1965.

Game 1 
October 20, Yankee Stadium, New York

Game 2 
October 21, Yankee Stadium, New York

Game 3 
October 23, Dodger Stadium, Los Angeles

Game 4 
October 24, Dodger Stadium, Los Angeles

Game 5 
October 25, Dodger Stadium, Los Angeles

Game 6 
October 28, Yankee Stadium, New York

1981 awards 

1981 Major League Baseball All-Star Game
Fernando Valenzuela starter
Davey Lopes starter
Dusty Baker reserve
Steve Garvey reserve
Pedro Guerrero reserve
Burt Hooton reserve
National League Rookie of the Year
Fernando Valenzuela
National League Cy Young Award
Fernando Valenzuela
NLCS Most Valuable Player
Burt Hooton
World Series Most Valuable Player
Ron Cey
Pedro Guerrero
Steve Yeager
Gold Glove Award
Dusty Baker
Roberto Clemente Award
Steve Garvey

Baseball Digest Rookie All-Star
Dave Stewart
Fernando Valenzuela
TSN Rookie Pitcher of the Year Award
Fernando Valenzuela
TSN Pitcher of the Year Award
Fernando Valenzuela
Silver Slugger Award
Fernando Valenzuela
Dusty Baker
TSN Major League Player of the Year Award
Fernando Valenzuela
TSN National League All-Star
Fernando Valenzuela
Pedro Guerrero
NL Pitcher of the Month
Fernando Valenzuela (April 1981)
NL Player of the Week
Fernando Valenzuela (Apr. 6–12)
Ron Cey (May 11–17)
Fernando Valenzuela (Aug. 31 – Sep. 6)

Farm system 

Teams in BOLD won League Championships

Major League Baseball Draft

The Dodgers drafted 33 players in the June draft and 18 in the January draft. Of those, eight players would eventually play in the Major Leagues. They received an extra pick in the 2nd round from the Houston Astros as compensation for the loss of free agent pitcher Don Sutton.

The Dodgers first round pick in the June draft was shortstop Dave Anderson from the University of Memphis. He played 10 seasons in the Majors (8 of them with the Dodgers), primarily as a utility infielder. The draft also included pitchers Sid Fernandez (round 3) and John Franco (round 5), both of whom would have lengthy Major League careers primarily with the New York Mets after the Dodgers traded them.

Notes

References 
Baseball-Reference season page
Baseball Almanac season page

External links 
1981 Los Angeles Dodgers uniform
Los Angeles Dodgers official website

Los Angeles Dodgers seasons
Los Angeles Dodgers season
National League West champion seasons
National League champion seasons
World Series champion seasons
Los